Roger Grimau Gragera (born 14 July 1978) is a Spanish retired professional basketball player who last played for La Bruixa d'Or Manresa. He is a 1.96 m (6'5") tall swingman, that could also play as a point guard.

Professional career
Grimau quickly moved to continue a family legacy in the world of basketball. Like his father before him, and as his two younger siblings who would follow suit, Roger rose to the ranks as a professional basketball player.

At Lleida, he propelled his team to the Liga ACB, Spanish basketball's premier division. He was the undoubted star of a young team which won promotion to the league. As well as being named an all-star in their promotion season, he also earned a move to his next club, FC Barcelona and with it, a call up to the Spain national team, with whom he won a gold medal at the 2001 Mediterranean Games.

In July 2011, he signed a two-year contract with Bilbao Basket. He rested in the club until September 2014.

In June 2015, Grimau decided to retire from basketball.

Spain national team
Grimau has also been a member of the Spain national basketball team. He won the gold medal at the 2001 Mediterranean games, and the silver medal at the EuroBasket 2003.

Coach career
After his retirement, for the 2015–16 season, Grimau started his coach career as assistant coach of Catalana amateur club CB Sant Just. One year later, he signed with Liga EBA club JAC Sants for his first experience as head coach.

Awards and achievements 
Pro career

Euroleague Champion:
2009–10
3x Spanish League Champion:
2003–04, 2008–09, 2010–11
3x Spanish Cup Champion:
2007, 2010, 2011
3x Spanish Supercup Champion:
2004, 2009, 2010

Caprabo Lleida

Spanish 2nd Division Champion:
2001

Spanish national team

FIBA EuroBasket 2003: 
2001 Mediterranean Games:

References

External links
Euroleague.net Profile
Eurobasket.com Profile
Spanish League Profile  

1978 births
Living people
Bilbao Basket players
Competitors at the 2001 Mediterranean Games
FC Barcelona Bàsquet players
Joventut Badalona players
Liga ACB players
Mediterranean Games gold medalists for Spain
Point guards
Shooting guards
Small forwards
Spanish basketball coaches
Spanish men's basketball players
Basketball players from Barcelona
Mediterranean Games medalists in basketball